The Tiffin Dragons are the athletic teams that represent Tiffin University, located in Tiffin, Ohio, in NCAA Division II intercollegiate sporting competitions. The Dragons compete as members of the Great Midwest Athletic Conference for varsity sports. Tiffin has been a member of the GMAC since 2018.

Varsity teams

List of teams

Men's sports (10)
Baseball
Basketball
Cross country
Football
Golf
Swimming and diving
Tennis
Track and field
Wrestling
Soccer
Lacrosse 

Women's sports (10)
Basketball
Cross country
Golf
Lacrosse
Soccer
Softball
Swimming and diving
Tennis
Track and field
Volleyball
Equestrian
Wrestling (Inaugural Season Fall 2018)

National championships

Team

Media
Football and basketball broadcasts can be heard on WTUD TUDragonradio.com and Coast Country 100.9 WMJK and feature broadcast professionals Russell Snyder and Matt Kibler. Full hour feature programs Dragon Nation and Dragon Nation Live can also be heard on WTUD the second Monday of each month. Coaches shows can be heard weekdays on WTUD, featuring coaches and student-athletes.

References

External links